Jackson Durai is a 2016 Tamil-language horror comedy film based on the theme in the classic goth story, The Legend of Sleepy Hollow, the movie is written and directed by Dharani Dharan, starring Sathyaraj, Sibiraj, and Bindu Madhavi in the leading roles, while Karunakaran, Rajendran, and Yogi Babu play supporting roles. Featuring music composed by Siddharth Vipin and editing by Vivek Harshan, the film released on 1 July 2016. The film was dubbed and released in Telugu as Dora The film was dubbed in Hindi as Jackson The Paying Guest.

Plot
Sub-Inspector Sathya (Sibiraj) is sent to Aynpuram, a village in which a large bungalow from British times is claimed to be haunted by a ghost called Jackson (Zachary Coffin) according to the villagers. Sathya's mission is to prove that there are no ghosts in the village. Will he succeed in proving it or not forms the rest of the story.

Cast

 Sathyaraj as Durai 
 Sibiraj as Sub-Inspector Sathya 
 Bindu Madhavi as Viji
 Karunakaran as Veera
 Rajendran as Bradlee (Suruli)
 Yogi Babu as Mani
 Zachary Coffin as Jackson
 Aanchal Singh as Amy Jackson
 Mahanadi Shankar
 Shanmugasundaram
 Neha Menon as Durai's Sister
 Shan
 TSR 
 Vijay Senathipathi

Production
Sri Green Productions agreed to finance Dharani Dharan's second directorial venture after Burma (2014), and signed on actors Sibiraj and Bindu Madhavi to appear in a horror film. The film began production in May 2015, and was described to be a thriller set in the 1940s with Sathyaraj, Rajendran and American actor Zachary signed on for pivotal roles.

Soundtrack
Soundtrack was composed by Siddharth Vipin and lyrics written by Dharani Dharan, Aravind Devaraj and Mohan Rajan. Behindwoods rated the album 2 out of 5 calling it "frivolous album which is high on freshness."

"Motorbike" - Anthony Daasan
"Jackson Durai" - Gana Bala
"Yethetho" - Chinmayi, Karthik

Release
The satellite rights of the film were sold to Sun TV. Digital rights Sold to Sun NXT and many other online platforms

Reception
Baradwaj Rangan of Hindu wrote "Jackson Durai only sounds like a horror comedy — the plot is more intricate, it wants to do more than just make you laugh, scream. It actually wants to tell some kind of story, a Groundhog Day-like story that keeps looping back on itself, each iteration the opportunity for a change." Sify wrote "Dharani Dharan’s ideology of mixing fantasy, horror and spoof is laudable but he hasn’t got the right screenplay. Although all the actors are capable of pulling off the characters given to them, the aimless screenplay doesn’t offer big entertainment." Behindwoods wrote "Overall the director seems to have tried his best at giving us an entertaining feature but instead cluelessly heads in a direction which lacks a sense of purpose. He handles a texture that is not definite and weaves a rather loose structure around it." Times of India wrote "The film is a horror comedy, a genre that is very much the trend today, and going by the director's previous film, you expect at least a competently made film that keeps us entertained. But the only thing that we have in store is disappointment." Top10cinema wrote "Definitely, a different horror tale, but lacks engagement."

References

External links
 

2016 films
Films scored by Siddharth Vipin
2010s Tamil-language films
Indian comedy horror films
Films set in the 1940s
Films set in the British Raj